Spielberg (formerly: Spielberg bei Knittelfeld) is a city located in the Bezirk Murtal in Styria, Austria.

General 

The city of Spielberg, with a population of about 5,000 inhabitants, is located north of the Mur in the east of Aichfeld, between the cities of Zeltweg and Knittelfeld. The municipal area of Knittelfeld has grown together with a part of the township. From 1986 to 2009 Spielberg was a Marktgemeinde. On October 1, 2009 it became a “Stadtgemeinde”. Within the district you can find both municipal and countrified mintages.

Structure 

The township is made up of 9 Katastralgemeinden. Pausendorf is the biggest Katastralgemeinde of 1500 inhabitants. The Katastralgemeinde Spielberg is only a small part of the township, but it gives its title to the whole municipality.

 Einhörn
 Laing
 Lind
 Maßweg
 Pausendorf
 Sachendorf
 Schönberg
 Spielberg
 Weyern

Politics 

The SPÖ has been the dominant position of the township since 1960, when the countrified township became a municipality.  This was triggered when a number of industrial firms moved to the township, above all the Austria Antriebstechnik AG (ATB).

Landmarks 
Spielberg is home to the Red Bull Ring (formerly known as A1-Ring and Österreichring). From 1970 until 1987 and from 1997 until 2003 the Grand Prix of Austria took place there. In 2014, it returned to the Formula 1 calendar. In 2020 the first 2 races of the delayed F1 season took place there: the Austrian GP and the Styrian GP. In 2021, following the postponement of the Turkish GP, a second race, the Styrian GP, was held one week before the Austrian GP.

References

External links 

 
 ATB (Spielberg's most important employer)
 Regionalbus Aichfeld (public transportation in Spielberg)

Cities and towns in Murtal District